Ivo Ivanov Ivanov (born 11 March 1985) is a Bulgarian football defender who currently plays for Rozova Dolina Kazanlak.

Career

Beroe
Ivanov began his career in Beroe and made his debut in the 2003-04 season. On 6 May 2010, Beroe won the Bulgarian Cup, beating Chernomorets Pomorie in the final. Ivanov played through the whole match. On 18 October 2009, he scored the only goal in a 1–0 away league win over Levski Sofia.

Levski Sofia
After playing seven seasons for Beroe, Ivanov signed a three-year-deal with Levski Sofia for a fee of around €100 000 on 8 June 2010. He made his unofficial debut for Levski in a pre-season friendly match against Târgu Mureş on 30 June, entering the match as a substitute.

Ivanov made his competitive debut for Levski in a match against Dundalk - a second qualifying round for Europa League. Levski won the first match and the result was 6–0. In Europa League match against Lille held on 4 November 2010, Levski was leading 2–1 until Ivo Ivanov scored an own goal shortly before the conclusion of the game to make it 2-2. On 17 April 2011, Ivanov scored the winning goal against Cherno More Varna in an A PFG match.

Return to Beroe
On 31 July 2012, Ivanov re-joined Beroe as part of a player exchange deal sending Dimitar Vezalov to Levski Sofia.

After the departure of Georgi Andonov from Beroe in August 2014, Ivanov was named as his replacement as club captain. On 20 January 2015, he signed a two-year contract extension, keeping him at Beroe until 2017. In May 2017, he left the club after his contract expired.

Vereya
On 19 June 2017, Ivanov made the short trip across Stara Zagora, signing with Vereya.

International
On 18 November 2009, Ivo Ivanov made his debut for the national team after coming on as a substitute in the 84th minute for Blagoy Georgiev in the 4:1 away win against Malta in a friendly match. He earned his second cap on 10 October 2015, in the 0:3 away loss against Croatia in a Euro 2016 qualifier.

Honours

Club
Beroe
Bulgarian Cup (2): 2009–2010, 2012–13
Bulgarian Supercup (1): 2013
East B PFG (1): 2008-09

Career statistics
As of 20 January 2018

References

External links
 Ivo at Levski's site
 
 Profile at LevskiSofia.info
 

1985 births
Living people
Bulgarian footballers
Bulgaria international footballers
First Professional Football League (Bulgaria) players
PFC Beroe Stara Zagora players
PFC Levski Sofia players
FC Vereya players
PFC Spartak Varna players
FC Levski Karlovo players
Association football defenders
People from Kazanlak